Matej Jug (born 25 September 1980) is a Slovenian international referee.

Career
Matej Jug became a FIFA referee in 2007. He has refereed at the 2014 FIFA World Cup qualifiers and UEFA Euro 2012 qualification.

References

External links

 Profile at EU-Football.info

1980 births
Living people
Slovenian football referees
UEFA Europa League referees